The 1972–73 FIBA European Cup Winners' Cup was the seventh edition of FIBA's 2nd-tier level European-wide professional club basketball competition, contested between national domestic cup champions, running from 18 October 1972, to 21 March 1973. It was contested by 26 teams, five more than in the previous edition.

1971 runner-up Spartak Leningrad, defeated Jugoplastika in the final, to become the first Soviet League team to win the competition, ending a 3-year period of Italian League dominance. It was the second straight final lost by a Yugoslav League team.

Participants

First round

|}

Second round

|}

Automatically qualified to the eighth finals
  Spartak Leningrad

Top 12

|}

Quarterfinals
The quarter finals were played with a round-robin system, in which every Two Game series (TGS) constituted as one game for the record.

Semifinals

|}

Final
March 20, Alexandreio Melathron, Thessaloniki

|}

References

External links 
FIBA European Cup Winner's Cup 1972–73 linguasport.com
FIBA European Cup Winner's Cup 1972–73

Cup
FIBA Saporta Cup